Jara Ackermann (born 20 May 2004) is a Liechtensteiner footballer who plays as a goalkeeper for St. Gallen-Staad and the Liechtenstein national football team.

Career statistics

International

External links
 Profile at FC St. Gallen's website

References

2004 births
Living people
Women's association football goalkeepers
Liechtenstein women's footballers
Liechtenstein women's international footballers